Arthur James Wilson (Faed Wilson) (1858–1945) was an English cyclist, cycling administrator, activist and journalist. He became deaf at age 12 after contracting scarlet fever and Faed was a self-applied anagram of 'deaf'. He was a member of the National Cyclists' Union executive committee and joint editor of the Bicycling Times and Touring Gazette. A founder member of the North Road Cycle club in 1885 he was associated with the industry, the sport, the journalism and the pastime of cycling and touring.

Personal life
He began cycling at the age of eleven and became deaf at age 12 after contracting scarlet fever, Faed was a self applied anagram of deaf.

Career
He joined Dunlop tyres in 1890 working at their Dublin offices. When they moved their operations to England in 1893 he worked for them as a manager in London.

Faed worked for over 50 years as an administrator of cycling, co-founding the 'North London Tricycling Club' (now renamed the 'North London Cycling Club'), the 'North Road Cycling Club', the 'Irish Road Club', the 'Road Records Association', and the 'Cycle Trades Benevolent Fund'.

His influence ranged from the design of the tandem bicycle to the original rules for road time-trials prior to 1900.

As a cyclist he won the 1886 North Road C.C. 50 Mile Road Championship together with champion cyclist Charlie Liles on a tandem.

The Golden Book
Arthur Wilson's achievements were celebrated in 1938 when Cycling Weekly awarded him his own page in the Golden Book of Cycling, which is now held in 'The Pedal Club' archive.

References

Further reading
A. J. Wilson: Otherwise Faed. Arthur F. Dimmock. .

1858 births
1945 deaths
Cycling journalists
Place of birth missing
English male cyclists
English journalists
Cycling advocates